Hon. Saul Solomon QC (1875–1960), styled Mr Justice Solomon, was a judge in the Supreme Court of South Africa.

Biography
Solomon was born in Sea Point, Cape Town, on 9 April 1875. His mother was Georgiana Solomon who was a teacher and later a suffragette. His father was Saul Solomon, the influential liberal politician of the Cape Colony. Saul Solomon was educated at Bedford School and at Lincoln College, Oxford, where he was a scholar. His sister Daisy Solomon was also a suffragette, and 'posted' as a letter to the British Prime Minister at 10 Downing Street in 1909.

Solomon was called to the English Bar by Lincoln's Inn, in 1900, appointed as King's Counsel, in 1919, and as a judge in the Supreme Court of South Africa, between 1927 and 1945.

Mr Justice Solomon died in St James, Cape Town, on 10 December 1960.

References

People educated at Bedford School
Alumni of Lincoln College, Oxford
20th-century King's Counsel
Members of Lincoln's Inn
English barristers
South African Jews
South African judges
People from Cape Town
1875 births
1960 deaths
South African Queen's Counsel